The Centennial National Bank is a historic building in Philadelphia, Pennsylvania. Designed by noted Philadelphia architect Frank Furness and significant in his artistic development, it was built in 1876 as the headquarters of the eponymous bank that would be the fiscal agent of the Centennial Exposition. The building housed a branch of the First Pennsylvania Bank from 1956 until Drexel University purchased it . Drexel renovated it between 2000-2002 and now uses it as an alumni center. The Centennial National Bank, described as "one of the best pieces of architecture in West Philadelphia," was placed on the National Register of Historic Places in 1971.

History
The Centennial National Bank opened for business in January 1876, shortly before its permanent building was constructed the same year. Architect Frank Furness, who had just parted ways with business partner George Hewitt, received the commission due to personal connections with the directors.

The bank obtained a monopoly over handling ticket receipts and currency exchanges for the Centennial Exposition, which opened on the Fourth of July to celebrate the 100-year anniversary of American independence, and operated a branch on the fairgrounds. It continued to operate as the only national bank in West Philadelphia for decades, and the building remained in use as a bank branch until it was vacated by the First Pennsylvania Bank between 1965 and 1971.

Drexel University purchased the building , using it primarily as office space and later to house university's alumni center.

Design and construction
The bank was chartered on January 19, 1876, to finance Philadelphia's coming-out on the world stage, the Centennial Exposition. The Exposition was the first World's Fair held in North America and its opening day, July 4, coincided with the 100-year of American independence. Its first president was Clarence Howard Clark, Sr., a financier and West Philadelphia resident and developer.

Clark hired Frank Furness, whom he had met in Unitarian circles, to design the bank's headquarters building. (Furness likely also knew bank co-founder Samuel Shipley.) He had worked previously on one of his most successful bank designs, the Guarantee Trust and Safe Deposit Company, with his partner George Hewitt. However, the partnership dissolved in the fall of 1875, leaving the firm without a mechanical engineer. The Centennial Bank was the first major project Furness took on afterward.

Strategically located at the corner of 32nd and Market streets, a building on the site would terminate the line of sight along the diagonal Lancaster Avenue, which led to the Exhibition grounds in West Fairmount Park. This is reflected in the entrance Furness designed, which cuts the corner to face Lancaster. Market Street also intersected with Woodland Avenue here, though both Woodland and Lancaster are no longer city streets. The site was perfectly positioned to attract fair-goers' business, as Furness anticipated. By April 1876, construction was complete and the building was in operation.

Use as a bank

During the Centennial Exposition, a branch operated on the fairgrounds and handled the collection and accounting of ticket revenues, as well as currency exchange.

By 1900, the bank remained the only national bank in West Philadelphia, posted profits of $274,392, and was directed by some of Philadelphia's "best known and most reputable business men.

In 1956, the building came to be occupied by the First Pennsylvania Banking and Trust Company as its "Centennial Branch." First Pennsylvania was still listed as the owner in 1965 but by 1971, the building stood vacant and was controlled by the Philadelphia Redevelopment Authority.

Reuse
The building was acquired by Drexel University around "the time of the Bicentennial," and was reported in 1986 to be "a dingy maze of Drexel University administrative offices" for which Drexel was trying to find renovation funding. The plan was to turn it into a museum. Instead, after a renovation, it was rededicated in 2002 as the "Paul Peck Alumni Center," to house the university's alumni relations center, meeting spaces, and an art gallery showing pieces from the university art collection.

Drexel used the bank in 2012 to host an exhibit of Frank Furness' commercial architecture.

Architecture

The Centennial National Bank's Venetian Gothic design by Frank Furness is considered, "a good example of his developing style," with the exterior retaining its original character though it has been altered. The design is a step in Furness' development of an independent style, a departure from earlier works which were in the British-influenced High Victorian Gothic style.

Shortly after construction, the building was described in an architectural magazine:

The method for making the "brilliant glass tiles" referred was invented by Furness himself. Glass was painted on the inward side, backed by a layer of gold leaf and then a layer of tin foil to hold the gold in place. This created colorfully reflective glass often used to suggest nature, as in floral ornamentation. In addition to the academy and the Centennial National, Furness used them in his Brazilian Court at the Centennial Exhibition, but not thereafter. Similar attempts at ornamental glass making were being carried on during the mid-1870s by John LaFarge and Louis Tiffany.

Alterations

Its interior was modified in 1893 and again in 1899, when Philadelphia architect Frank Miles Day built a rear addition that followed Furness's style.

In 1956 its single floor was split in two, and the exterior was simplified, as designed by architect Bud Ross.

The building was renovated in 2000-02 (under Voith & Mactavish Architects) to make it an alumni center for Drexel University, at a cost of $4 million, .

Recognition
The bank was included in the Historic American Buildings Survey in 1965, as part of the National Park Service's Mission 66 program. It was listed on the Philadelphia Register of Historic Places on January 4, 1966, and then on the National Register of Historic Places on March 11, 1971. The National Register nomination cited the building's architectural and commercial significance, calling it "a significant work of architecture, one of the major surviving works of Frank Furness, one of the major examples of Victorian architecture in Philadelphia and one of the best pieces of architecture in West Philadelphia."

Notes

References

Historic American Buildings Survey in Philadelphia
Drexel University
Bank buildings on the National Register of Historic Places in Philadelphia
Frank Furness buildings
Commercial buildings completed in 1876
Centennial Exposition
University City, Philadelphia
Philadelphia Register of Historic Places